Donald James Maggs (born November 1, 1961 in Youngstown, Ohio) is a former American football tackle/guard in the USFL and NFL for the Houston Oilers and Denver Broncos.

1961 births
Living people
Pittsburgh Maulers players
New Jersey Generals players
Houston Oilers players
Denver Broncos players
American football offensive linemen
Tulane Green Wave football players